Sparganopseustis unithicta is a species of moth of the family Tortricidae. It is found in Peru.

The wingspan is about 28 mm. The ground colour of the forewings is pale brownish ferruginous in the dorsal half of the wing and brownish olive along the costa and terminally. The hindwings are grey, but paler basally.

Etymology
The species name refers to the presence of a costal spot and is derived from Latin unus (meaning one) and Greek thicta, from thixo (meaning touched).

References

Moths described in 2010
Sparganothini
Moths of South America
Taxa named by Józef Razowski